James Patrick Slattery Matthews (4 June 1880 – 19 May 1940) was an Australian rules footballer who played with Carlton in the Victorian Football League (VFL).

Notes

External links 

Jim Matthews's profile at Blueseum

1880 births
1940 deaths
Australian rules footballers from Victoria (Australia)
Carlton Football Club players